Seán Haughey (born 8 November 1961) is an Irish Fianna Fáil politician who has been a Teachta Dála (TD) for the Dublin Bay North constituency since 2016, and previously from 1992 to 2011 for the Dublin North-Central constituency. He served as a Minister of State from 2006 to 2011 and Lord Mayor of Dublin from 1989 to 1990. He was a Senator for the Administrative Panel from 1987 to 1992.

Early life 
The son of former Taoiseach Charles Haughey and Maureen Lemass, Haughey was educated at St Paul's College, Raheny, Dublin, and Trinity College Dublin, where he received a Bachelor of Arts degree in Economics and Politics.

Political career 
Haughey entered politics in 1985 when he was elected to Dublin City Council for the Artane local electoral area. He was re-elected to the council in 1991 and 1999 and served until 2003. He was Lord Mayor of Dublin from 1989 to 1990.

Haughey served as a member of Seanad Éireann from 1987 until 1992. In that year he was elected to Dáil Éireann as a Fianna Fáil TD for Dublin North-Central. He had unsuccessfully contested the Dublin North-East constituency at the 1987 and 1989 general elections.

In June 2006, Haughey apologised for failing to disclose receiving £2,300 from Monarch Properties to the Mahon Tribunal. Haughey was appointed by Bertie Ahern in December 2006 as a Minister of State at the Department of Education and Science, with responsibility for Adult Education, Youth Affairs and Educational Disadvantage. In June 2007, he was appointed as Minister of State at the Department of Education and Science and at the Department of Enterprise, Trade and Employment with responsibility for Lifelong Learning, Youth Work and School Transport. He was re-appointed by Brian Cowen in 2008, and again when the number of junior ministers was reduced.

He lost his seat at the 2011 general election. He was elected to Dublin City Council for the Clontarf local electoral area at the 2014 local elections. He regained a seat in the Dáil at the 2016 general election, when he was returned for the new Dublin Bay North constituency. He was re-elected at the general election in February 2020.

As of 2021, Haughey is the biggest stock market shareholder in the Dáil, holding at least €442,000 in shares, including shares in Pfizer and Amazon.

Personal life 
Haughey is a member of a political family. His father was Charles Haughey, while his maternal grandfather was Seán Lemass; each served as Taoiseach. His uncle Noel Lemass and aunt Eileen Lemass were also members of Dáil Éireann. Through his father, Haughey is also related to Olympic medalist Siobhán Haughey.

Haughey is married to Orla O'Brien, and the couple have four children.

On 4 February 2021, he undertook godparenthood for Vitold Ashurak, Belarusian activist and political prisoner. After the death of Ashurak in May, Haughey took over the patronage of Dzyanis Ivashin, a journalist of Novy Chas and Belarusian political prisoner, on 30 June 2021.

See also
Families in the Oireachtas

References

External links
Seán Haughey's page on the Fianna Fáil website

1961 births
Living people
Alumni of Trinity College Dublin
Children of Taoisigh
Fianna Fáil TDs
Lemass family
Lord Mayors of Dublin
Members of the 18th Seanad
Members of the 19th Seanad
Members of the 27th Dáil
Members of the 28th Dáil
Members of the 29th Dáil
Members of the 30th Dáil
Members of the 32nd Dáil
Members of the 33rd Dáil
Ministers of State of the 29th Dáil
Ministers of State of the 30th Dáil
People educated at St Paul's College, Raheny
Fianna Fáil senators
Haughey family